St. Peter's Church (Dutch: Pieterskerk) is a Reformed and former Roman Catholic church in the city of Utrecht in the Netherlands, dedicated to Peter the Apostle. It is one of the city's oldest churches. Its construction began in 1039 and it was inaugurated on 1 May 1048 by Bernold, Bishop of Utrecht (although the lost west towers were probably only finished about a century after the inauguration).  The church was the eastern end of Utrecht's "Kerkenkruis", of which the Domkerk the centre is.  Characteristic of the Romanesque style in which it is built are the church's large nave pillars, each hewn from one piece of red sandstone, and the crypt under the choir.  The building is now used by the Walloon Church.

Gallery

Churches completed in 1048
11th-century churches
Churches in Utrecht (city)
Rijksmonuments in Utrecht (city)
Reformed church buildings in the Netherlands
Romanesque architecture in the Netherlands
Dutch Reformed Church buildings
Protestant churches converted from Roman Catholicism